Kemelah is a state constituency in Johor, Malaysia, that is represented in the Johor State Legislative Assembly.

The state constituency was first contested in 2004 and is mandated to return a single Assemblyman to the Johor State Legislative Assembly under the first-past-the-post voting system. , the State Assemblyman for Kemelah is Saraswathy Nallathanby from BN-MIC.

Definition 
The Kemelah constituency contains the polling districts of Segamat Baru, Ladang Segamat, FELDA Kemelah, Redong, Sekijang, Chuan Moh San, Kampong Melayu Raya, Bukit Siput, Pekan Bukit Siput Utara, Paya Pulai, Pogoh, Ladang Labis Bahru and Pekan Bukit Siput Selatan.

History

Poling district
According to the gazette issued on 30 March 2018, the Kemelah constituency has a total of 13 polling districts.

Representation history

Election results

References 

Johor state constituencies